, known exclusively by his stage name Pata, is a Japanese musician. He is best known as rhythm guitarist of the visual kei rock band X Japan. He joined the band in 1987, stayed with them until their dissolution in 1997, and rejoined when the band reunited in 2007.

A year after their breakup, he formed the short-lived duo P.A.F. with singer NoB and created the band Dope HEADz with X Japan bassist Heath and former Spread Beaver percussionist/programmer I.N.A. in 2000. Right after they ceased activity, Pata formed the instrumental band Ra:IN in 2002, which still tours extensively to this day.

His stage name is taken from the manga Patalliro!, as he was said to resemble the title character.

Career

1980–1997: Early bands and X Japan

Little is known about Pata's early years as he tends to keep his past and personal life to himself. He first played a guitar in junior high school. It was an acoustic one that his younger sister bought, and which he still owns. He taught himself to play guitar on a Fender Stratocaster. He formed his first band in 1980, and two years later created the band Black Rose, later known as Judy, but chose to disband it in 1985 or 1986. Prior to disbanding, Yoshiki filled in on drums at several performances. Pata actually asked Yoshiki to join Judy, as at the time X Japan was going through member changes, but he declined. According to Yoko of United, Pata was a roadie for brief X member Hally and used Hally's guitar when he joined X himself.

Pata first played with X Japan (then named X) in 1987 as a session musician, on the songs "Stab Me in the Back" and "No Connexion" for the sampler Skull Thrash Zone Volume I. After supporting them at a couple live shows, he officially joined the band later that year. They released their first album Vanishing Vision in 1988 and toured extensively in support of the record. They would become one of the first Japanese acts to achieve mainstream success while on an independent label, and later widely credited as one of the pioneers of visual kei.

X 's major label debut album, Blue Blood, was released in April 1989 and debuted at number six on the Oricon chart. Its success earned the band the "Grand Prix New Artist of the Year" award at the 4th annual Japan Gold Disc Awards in 1990. Their third album Jealousy was released in 1991 and debuted at number one, selling over 600,000 copies. It was later certified million by the RIAJ. Shortly after the release of 1993's Art of Life, which also topped the Oricon, the members of X Japan took a break to start solo projects. Dahlia, which would become the band's last album, was released on November 4, 1996 and once again, it reached the number one spot. In September 1997, it was announced that X Japan would disband, they performed their farewell show, aptly titled The Last Live, at the Tokyo Dome on December 31, 1997.

1993–present: Solo career, Ra:IN and other work
 
In 1993, while still in X Japan, Pata released his first self-titled solo album, which featured many veteran American musicians such as Tommy Aldridge, Tim Bogert, Mike Porcaro and James Christian. His second, Raised on Rock, was released two years later and again featured Christian, as well as Chuck Wright and Ken Mary. He also played at a number of concerts for fellow X Japan lead guitarist Hide's solo career from 1994 to 1998. A year after X Japan's breakup, he formed P.A.F. (standing for "Patent Applied For", named after the PAF guitar pickups) with singer NoB. In about one year's time they released: two albums, one mini album, one live album and two singles. For the 1999 Hide tribute album, Tribute Spirits, Pata teamed up with X Japan bassist Heath and former Spread Beaver percussionist/programmer I.N.A. to cover the X Japan song "Celebration". He would reunite with them again in 2000 when they formed Dope HEADz, adding vocalist Jo:Ya. They released two singles and an album, when in 2002 they recruited new singer Shame and released Planet of Dope. Soon after its release they would cease activity.

The same year he formed the instrumental rock band Ra:IN (standing for "Rock and Inspiration"), with bassist Michiaki and drummer Tetsu (he later having previously played with him in P.A.F.). In 2007, after three albums, former Spread Beaver member DIE joined Ra:IN as keyboardist. They tour extensively, having performed quite a few overseas shows, including a lengthy European tour in 2009.

In 2003, Pata played live support for Miyavi at a couple of his concerts, along with former Spread Beaver bassist Chirolyn, Seikima-II guitarist Luke Takamura and Luna Sea drummer Shinya. In 2005, Pata appeared on Nanase Aikawa's album R.U.O.K.?!, as did DIE, Shinya, Dead End bassist Crazy Cool Joe and former Megadeth guitarist Marty Friedman, they all supported her on the album's tour.

2007–present: X Japan reunion

According to a report by the newspaper Sponichi, X Japan vocalist Toshi visited drummer Yoshiki in Los Angeles in November 2006 to work on a song as a tribute to Hide. In March 2007, Toshi announced on his website that he and Yoshiki had recently resumed working together, stating that a "new project" would commence soon. Rumors of a X Japan reunion subsequently began, and in June Yoshiki was reported as having expressed interest in a tour and that he was in talks with Heath and Pata regarding their participation. On October 22, 2007, X Japan announced their reunion and released the Saw IV theme song, "I.V.".

In 2010, they went on their first North American tour from September 25 to October 10. Their first world tour began with four gigs in Europe from June 28 to July 4, 2011 and was resumed from September to October with five shows in South America and five in Asia.

On September 22, 2013, Pata appeared at a concert in memory of Hide, hosted by Sexxx George (Ladies Room), performing in a special band with George, Eby (ex-Zi:Kill), Yoshihiko (heidi.) and Cutt. For the Hide tribute album Tribute VII -Rock Spirits-, released on December 18, 2013, Pata reunited with Spread Beaver members Joe, INA and Chirolyn and Dope HEADz vocalist Shame to record a new version of "Pink Spider" under the name The Pink Spiders.

On January 15, 2016, Pata was rushed to the intensive care unit of a Tokyo hospital. He was diagnosed with colon diverticulitis and a severe blood clot in his portal vein, but in stable condition. In June, Yoshiki stated that Pata was discharged in March, but had to go back for surgery in August. Pata announced he was discharged on August 10. X Japan ended up postponing their album release and March 12, 2016 concert at the Wembley Arena in London for a whole year; the latter being held on March 4, 2017.

Equipment

Pata is noted as the only member of X Japan who plays American-made instruments, almost always seen playing a vintage Gibson Les Paul. Previously, he often used a yellow 1959 Les Paul Standard nicknamed  or his . Although he still uses it for recording, it has been retired from live performances since 2008 due to its value, which is reportedly enough to buy a house. He now mainly uses a 1955 Goldtop or a black 1975 Les Paul Custom. The Goldtop's paint is rubbed down to the wood, earning it the nickname . Its pickups and tailpiece were already altered when he acquired it, the former having been swapped out for humbuckers. Since X Japan's reunion, Pata occasionally uses a wine red 1976 Custom, which has a Tom Holmes 453 pickup in the rear. He has owned several other Les Paul Customs, including a white one nicknamed .

In addition to his lineup of Les Pauls, Pata owns several other guitars such as an acoustic-electric by Takamine. His 1990s Gibson EDS-1275 double neck guitar has had all of its pickups changed, including the 12-string side to Burstbuckers, and its tailpiece changed to "Jimmy Page specifications". As of 2022, he had recently stopped using it live due to its heavy weight. Around 1995, Pata had a signature model guitar made by Burny, the EX-85P or its higher-end EX-240P, based on the 1958 Gibson Explorer. Pata's own copy of the guitar is made of korina and has Tom Holmes pickups. Before X Japan's 2014 concert at Madison Square Garden, Burny presented Pata with the prototype of his former bandmate Hide's signature Kujira model.

Pata prefers to change guitars on stage as little as possible. He uses four or five with X Japan due to their different tunings, but only about two for Ra:IN; one for regular tuning and one for drop tuning. Pata previously used D'Addario 011-049 strings, but found it difficult to bend the top string. While recording Art of Life (1993) in America, he happened to buy La Bella HRS-010-048 strings at a local music shop and has used them ever since. Similarly, he bought a Dunlop 0.73mm nylon guitar pick at the same time, and has used them ever since. Although he sometimes uses a slightly stiffer one for acoustic guitar. Pata uses two old Marshall guitar amplifiers, which originally did not have master volume knobs, but have been altered to have them. Because the bass tends to get "muddy" when using distortion, the older amp on top is used for the main melody, while the bottom amp is used to correct the bass. Pata uses minimal effects pedals. As of 2022, he had an MXR Phase 100 phaser, an MK.4.23 booster, a Free the Tone delay, and a Vox wah pedal. Toru Saito has been his guitar tech since X Japan's 1991 Violence in Jealousy Tour.

Discography
Pata (November 4, 1993), Oricon Peak Position: #11
Pata's Bootleg (1994, VHS)
"Fly Away" (September 21, 1994) #35
"Shine on Me" (January 21, 1995) #94
Raised on Rock (July 5, 1995) #33
Improvisation Guitar Style (August 20, 2007, DVD)

With P.A.F.
"Love & Fake" (February 21, 1998)
Patent Applied For (March 25, 1998)
"Slapstick Life" (October 21, 1998)
"The Big Time" (January 21, 1999)
Pat.#0002 (February 24, 1999)
Live (July 23, 1999)

With Dope HEADz
"Glow" (February 21, 2001) #35
"True Lies" (April 25, 2001) #35
Primitive Impulse (June 6, 2001) #20
Planet of the Dope (July 24, 2002) #59

With Rain
Ra:IN discography

With X Japan

Other work
Sound Locomotive (Motoaki Furukawa, June 24, 1992, guitar solo (left) on "Fantastic Offroader")
Overdoing (Tokyo Yankees, October 20, 1992, guest guitar on "Drugstore Cowboy")
Ja, Zoo (hide with Spread Beaver, November 21, 1998, guitar on "Fish Scratch Fever" and "Hurry Go Round")
Tribute Spirits (Various artists, May 1, 1999, "Celebration")
R.U.O.K.?!, (Nanase Aikawa, November 19, 2005, guitar on "Foolish 555", "Rock Star's Steady" and "Everybody Goes")
"In Motion" (hide, July 10, 2002, guitar)
Psyence a Go Go (hide, March 19, 2008, guitar)
Hide Our Psychommunity (hide, April 23, 2008, guitar)
Attitude (film, July 19, 2009, cameo appearance)

Samurai Japan (Toshi, February 24, 2010)
Tribute VII -Rock Spirits (Various artists, December 18, 2013, "Pink Spider")
Junk Story (hide documentary film, May 23, 2015, as himself)
Music Not Fade Away (Seizi Kimura, 2018, guitar)
"Red Swan" (Yoshiki feat. Hyde, October 3, 2018, guest guitar)

References

External links

Official website
Official MySpace

X Japan members
Rhythm guitarists
1965 births
Living people
Visual kei musicians
People from Chiba (city)
Musicians from Chiba Prefecture
20th-century Japanese guitarists
21st-century Japanese guitarists
Japanese heavy metal guitarists
Japanese rock guitarists